La Genuina (Spanish: "The Genuine") was a military uprising in Venezuela, led by General Luciano Mendoza. It took place in Bolívar state in September 1867, and was held against Juan Crisóstomo Falcón. He was followed by General Miguel Antonio Rojas in Aragua State and also by Pedro Arana in Carabobo State.

Response & Suppression 
Falcón responded by sending his generals to supress the uprising - Pedro Manuel Rojas to the south-east and José Loreto Arismendi and José Eusebio Acosta to the east. Manuel Ezequiel Bruzual was placed in charge of the General Staff. The original uprising was finally suppressed at Cerro La Esperanza, in Petare, by the government's General Justo Valles and General Vidal Rebolledo, forcing the other rebels to limit themselves to guerrilla activity. On 16 October, Blanco Guzmán negotiated a peace agreement with Mendoza. Two days later a pardon was delivered.

See also 

 Federal War

References 

Wars involving Venezuela
Rebellions in Venezuela
1860s in Venezuela